Moses Anafie (born 23 August 1988) is a Ghanaian cricketer. He was named in Ghana's squad for the 2017 ICC World Cricket League Division Five tournament in South Africa. He played in Ghana's second fixture, against Vanuatu, on 4 September 2017.

In August 2021, he was named in Ghana's squad for their Twenty20 International (T20I) series against Rwanda. He made his T20I debut for Ghana on 18 August 2021, against Rwanda.

References

External links
 

1988 births
Living people
Ghanaian cricketers
Ghana Twenty20 International cricketers
Place of birth missing (living people)